Reuben Phillips (died February 13, 1974 in San Juan, Puerto Rico) was an American jazz saxophonist, arranger and bandleader, born in Providence, Kentucky.

After five years as an alto saxophonist with Andy Kirk and his Clouds of Joy, he played with Willis Jackson (1950) then Josephine Baker and Louis Jordan (1951). From 1952, Phillips has been a freelance arranger, musician and band leader in the New York area. He made arrangements for Dinah Washington, Lavern Baker, Ruth Brown, Billy Ward, Earl Bostic, Arnett Cobb among others.

He also played and recorded with Gene Redd, Sammy Lowe, George Rhodes, Dud Bascomb, and later recorded with Willis Jackson (1970) and Erskine Hawkins (1971).

He recorded two albums with his own big band, the house band at the Apollo Theatre on 125th Street in Harlem in the 1960s and 70s.

He died in San Juan of an apparent heart attack at the age of 53.

Discography 
As a leader
1960: Manhattan...3:00 A.M. (Poplar 1003)
1961: Big band at the Apollo (Ascot 16004)

As a sideman
 Andy Kirk, Live at the Apollo, 1944–47
 Louis Jordan And his orchestra, 1951
 George Rhodes, Plays Porgy and Bess, 1958
 Willis Jackson, Recording session, 1970
 Erskine Hawkins, Live at Club Soul Sound, 1971

References 

Year of birth missing
1974 deaths
Big band bandleaders
Swing bandleaders
American jazz saxophonists
American male saxophonists
People from Providence, Kentucky
Jazz musicians from Kentucky
American male jazz musicians
20th-century American saxophonists